The Datsun Type 15 was a small car produced in Japan in the 1930s. It had a  side valve engine and was offered in several body styles.

Design
The Datsun 15 was mechanically very similar to the preceding Datsun Type 14. Externally, the car was larger than its predecessor, but with less chrome detail (material was becoming harder to find because of the war in Manchuria); similarly, the interior was larger but more sparse. The front end resembled American cars of the period, but on a smaller scale. All Datsun 15 models had bumpers.

Production
The first Datsun 15 rolled off the production line in Yokohama in May 1936 and production continued until the Datsun 16 was released in April 1937. The majority were for home use, but 87 were exported.

Datsun 15T
Between May 1936 and April 1938 Nissan produced the Datsun 15T truck based on the Datsun 15. The engine cover was different, with near vertical vents instead of the cars horizontal vents.

References

Type 15
Rear-wheel-drive vehicles
Cars introduced in 1936
Nissan trucks